Phytochemistry is a peer-reviewed scientific journal covering pure and applied plant chemistry, plant biochemistry and molecular biology. It is published by Elsevier and is an official publication for the Phytochemical Society of Europe, the Phytochemical Society of North America, and the Phytochemical Society of Asia.

A sister journal Phytochemistry Letters is published since 2008.

Abstracting and indexing 
Phytochemistry is abstracted and indexed in:

According to the Journal Citation Reports, the journal has a 2020 impact factor of 4.072.

References

External links 

Biochemistry journals
Botany journals
Elsevier academic journals
English-language journals
Publications established in 1961